Astrovan may refer to:
Astronaut transfer van
Chevrolet Astro